Clive Coleman (born October 1961) is an English barrister turned journalist, who, from 2010 to 2020, has been the
BBC News Legal Correspondent. He is also a playwright, film and sitcom writer.

Early Years
Coleman grew up in North London attending Dame Alice Owen's School and then University College School.  He studied English Literature at York University from 1981–84, before taking a Law conversion course and then the Bar Finals in 1985 to qualify as a barrister.

Law
Called to the bar in 1986, he practised from the chambers of Robin Stewart QC, He worked in criminal law (both for defence and Crown Prosecution Service), and civil law (insolvency, medical negligence and property). In 1990 he left full time practice and taught on the Bar Vocational Course at the Inns of Court School of Law, becoming a Principal Lecturer.

Coleman holds an Honorary Doctorate of Laws from the University of West London.  In 2018 he was made an Honorary Bencher of the Middle Temple.  Both awards recognise his work as a legal journalist.

Writing
The move into education allowed Coleman time to develop his creative writing career. He started making regular contributions to radio series Weekending and The News Huddlines, wrote the sitcom Hair In The Gate which starred Alistair McGowan, and co-wrote Control Group 6, with Richard Bean, Andrew Clifford and Colin Swash. He then contributed to television comedy series Spitting Image, and  Dead Ringers. Coleman also contributed to ITV series including The Bill (for whom he has also acted as storyline consultant),  and Crossroads; and wrote the comedy drama High Table starring Dawn French for Tiger Aspect/BBC.

Coleman wrote the sitcom Chambers, set in what was described as "perhaps the country's least spectacular law chambers". Launched on BBC Radio 4 in 1996, ran for three series, before transferring to BBC One  for two hit television series, using many of the same scripts in a different order for its 12 episodes. The series starred John Bird, James Fleet, Jonathan Kydd and Sarah Lancashire.

In 2014 he collaborated with Richard Bean on the play Great Britain. 
In 2017 he co-wrote the play Young Marx also with Richard Bean. The biographical comedy about the chaotic life of the young Karl Marx, was directed by  Nicholas Hytner and starred Rory Kinnear. It was the premiere production which opened London's  new Bridge Theatre in October 2017.

In 2020, Coleman, again working with Bean, wrote the film The Duke, released in 2022.  It tells the story of Kempton Bunton, a Newcastle cab driver prosecuted for the 1961 theft of Francisco Goya’s portrait of the Duke of Wellington from the National Gallery in London. Directed by Roger Michell, it stars Jim Broadbent as Bunton, Dame Helen Mirren as his wife Dorothy and Fionn Whitehead as their son Jackie.  Co-stars include Matthew Goode, Anna Maxwell-Martin and Sian Clifford.  It premiered at the 2020 Venice Film festival, receiving 5 star reviews in The Guardian, The Telegraph and The Daily Mail.

Journalism
From 2004 - 2010 
Coleman presented the BBC Radio 4 legal analysis programme Law in Action. In 2009 he won the Bar Council Legal Broadcasting Award for a programme on the controversial legal doctrine of ‘joint enterprise’.

In 2010 Coleman became the BBC's Legal Correspondent covering major domestic and international legal stories across the BBC news output on television, radio and online. These included phone hacking, the Hillsborough Inquest verdicts, disclosure failings in the criminal justice system, the courts backlog, GDPR and the release of the London Bridge bomber Usman Khan.

In 2019 he won the Bar Council Legal Broadcasting Award for coverage of the UK Supreme Court case which decided that the Prime Minister Boris Johnson’s advice to the Queen to prorogue parliament was unlawful. 

In a piece following the death of his sister Sarah, a lifelong non-smoker, from lung cancer Coleman won the 2018 GLCC (Global Lung Cancer Coalition) Cancer Journalism Award for excellence in lung cancer journalism.

He has presented a raft of other BBC programmes including Panorama BBC 1, 2009 The Death of Kiss and Tell, and Pick of the Week, Profile, and The Cases That Changed Our World on Radio 4.

Coleman has also been a columnist for The Times, and has also written for The Guardian and The Independent.

Awards
1992: BBC Radio Light Entertainment Contract Writers Award
1994: Writers' Guild nomination for Control Group Six
1998: inaugural BBC Frank Muir Award for comedy writing, co-winner with Tony Roche
2009: Bar Council’s Legal Broadcasting Award <small>(for Law in Action)</small>
2018: Bar Council Legal Broadcasting Award (as part of team for coverage of disclosure crisis in the Criminal Justice System).
2018 GLCC (Global Lung Cancer Coalition) Cancer Journalism Award for excellence in lung cancer journalism.
2019: Bar Council Legal Broadcasting Award (for his BBC News coverage of the 2019 Supreme Court Prorogation Case'').

References

External links

Coleman at Journalisted

Living people
English barristers
Academics of City, University of London
English comedy writers
BBC newsreaders and journalists
Place of birth missing (living people)
1961 births